Zbyszko Piwoński (9 July 1929 – 2 August 2022) was a Polish teacher and politician. A member of the Polish United Workers' Party and later the Democratic Left Alliance, he served as Voivode of Zielona Góra Voivodeship from 1984 to 1990 and was a Senator from 1993 to 2005.

Piwoński died on 2 August 2022, at the age of 93.

References

1929 births
2022 deaths
Democratic Left Alliance politicians
Polish schoolteachers
Recipients of the Medal of the Commission for National Education
People from Węgrów County
Members of the Senate of Poland 1993–1997
Members of the Senate of Poland 1997–2001
Members of the Senate of Poland 2001–2005
Recipient of the Meritorious Activist of Culture badge